Bulinus is a genus of small tropical freshwater snails, aquatic gastropod mollusks in the family Bulinidae, the ramshorn snails and their allies. 

This genus is medically important because several species of Bulinus function as intermediate hosts for the schistosomiasis blood fluke.

Taxonomy
Miocene genus Kosovia was synonymized Bulinus in 2017.

Distribution
These snails are widespread in Africa including Madagascar and the Middle East.

This genus has not yet become established in the USA, but it is considered to represent a potentially serious threat as a pest, an invasive species which could negatively affect agriculture, natural ecosystems, human health or commerce. Therefore it has been suggested that this species be given top national quarantine significance in the USA.

Shell description 
The shell of species in the genus Bulinus is sinistral. It has a very large body whorl and a small spire.

Species

Species within the genus Bulinus have been placed into four species groups: the Bulinus africanus group, Bulinus forskalii group, Bulinus reticulatus group and the Bulinus truncatus/tropicus complex. For the most part, species have been classified on the basis of their morphology although, in recent decades, the study of ploidy, allozymes and DNA methods have all played an increasing role in species discrimination. Morphological characters, whilst adequate to allocate a specimen to a species group are sometimes unreliable when used to classify at higher resolution especially within the Bulinus africanus group.

There are 37 (or 38 species when the Bulinus mutandensis is recognized as a separate species) species within the genus Bulinus including:

Bulinus africanus group - 10 species
 Bulinus abyssinicus (Martens, 1866)
 Bulinus africanus (Krauss, 1848)
 Bulinus globosus  (Morelet, 1866)
 Bulinus hightoni Brown & Wright, 1978
 Bulinus jousseaumei (Dautzenberg, 1890)
 Bulinus nasutus (Martens, 1879)
 Bulinus obtusispira (Smith, 1882)
 Bulinus obtusus Mandahl-Barth, 1973
 Bulinus ugandae Mandahl-Barth, 1954
 Bulinus umbilicatus Mandahl-Barth, 1973

Bulinus forskalii group - 11 species
 Bulinus barthi Jelnes, 1979
 Bulinus bavayi (Dautzenberg, 1894)
 Bulinus beccarii (Paladilhe, 1872)
 Bulinus browni Jelnes, 1979
 Bulinus camerunensis Mandahl-Barth, 1957
 Bulinus canescens (Morelet, 1868)
 Bulinus cernicus (Morelet, 1867)
 Bulinus crystallinus (Morelet, 1868)
 Bulinus forskalii (Ehrenberg, 1831)
 Bulinus scalaris (Dunker, 1845)
 Bulinus senegalensis Müller, 1781 -  the type species of the genus

Bulinus reticulatus group - 2 species
 Bulinus reticulatus Mandahl-Barth, 1954
 Bulinus wrighti Mandahl-Barth, 1965

Bulinus truncatus/tropicus complex - 14-15 species
 Bulinus angolensis (Morelet, 1866)
 Bulinus depressus Haas, 1936
 Bulinus hexaploidus Burch, 1972
 Bulinus liratus (Tristram, 1863)
 Bulinus mutandensis Preston, 1913
 Bulinus natalensis (Küster, 1841)
 Bulinus nyassanus (E. A. Smith, 1877)
 Bulinus octoploidus Burch, 1972
 Bulinus permembranaceus (Preston, 1912)
 Bulinus succinoides (E. A. Smith, 1877)
 Bulinus transversalis (Martens, 1897)
 Bulinus trigonus (Martens, 1892)
 Bulinus tropicus (Krauss, 1848)
 Bulinus truncatus (Audouin, 1827)
 Bulinus yemenensis Paggi et al., 1978

other
 Bulinus rubellus Broderip 1832
 † Bulinus bouei (Pavlović, 1931) - from late Miocene
 † Bulinus corici Harzhauser & Neubauer in Harzhauser et al., 2012 - from middle Miocene
 † Bulinus matejici (Pavlović, 1931) - from middle Miocene
 † Bulinus ornatus (Pavlović, 1931) - from late Miocene
 † Bulinus pavlovici (Atanacković, 1959) - from late Miocene
 † Bulinus stevanovici (Atanacković, 1959) - late Miocene
 † Bulinus striatus (Milošević, 1978) - late Miocene

References 
This article incorporates CC-BY-2.5 text from the reference

External links